The Serbian Orthodox Diocese of Canada is a diocese of the Serbian Orthodox Church.

Its headquarters (the Holy Transfiguration Monastery) and bishop's residence are in Campbellville, Milton, Ontario with the Saint Nicholas Serbian Orthodox Cathedral in Hamilton, Ontario serving as the cathedral church. Its current primate is Bishop Mitrofan (Kodić).

History and organization
The Serbian Orthodox Diocese of Canada, part of the Serbian Orthodox Church in North and South America, is an integral part of the Serbian Orthodox Patriarchate with its See in Belgrade, and accordingly answers to its national church, the Serbian Orthodox Church (SOC), one of the autocephalous and canonical Orthodox Christian churches.

The Serbian Orthodox Diocese in the United States and Canada was established in 1921. In 1963, it was reorganized into three sections and in 1983, a fourth diocese was created specifically for the Canadian churches. This followed a period of growth in Serb immigrants to Canada following World War II, as well as a desire in decades prior for the Serbian Orthodox clergy to reach their parisioners more easily.

The Serbian Orthodox Diocese of Canada was founded on May 26, 1983 at the behest of Sava Vuković, the then-bishop of Eastern-America and Canada. On May 16, 1984 Georgije Đokić was elected as its first bishop. The Serbian Orthodox Diocese of Canada covers 33 parishes and missionary parishes.

On May 21, 2009 the Holy Assembly of Bishops of the Serbian Orthodox Church held a meeting for the restructuring of the existing Dioceses in North and South America, based on the recommendation of the Episcopal Council of the Serbian Orthodox Church. It was restructured in the following manner:

 The Metropolitanate of Libertyville-Chicago, with its See at St. Sava Monastery in Libertyville
 The Diocese of New Gracanica-Midwestern America, with its see at the Monastery of New Gračanica
 The Diocese of Eastern America, with its see in New Rochelle
 The Diocese of Western America, with its see in Los Angeles/Alhambra
 The Diocese of Canada, with its see in Milton

See also

 Saint Sava Serbian Orthodox Monastery and Seminary
 Serbian Orthodox Church in North and South America
 Serbian Orthodox Eparchy of Buenos Aires and South America
 Serbian Orthodox Eparchy of Eastern America
 Serbian Orthodox Eparchy of New Gračanica and Midwestern America
 Serbian Orthodox Eparchy of Western America
 Serbs in Canada

References

Sources

External links
 Diocese of Canada, Official Site
 Diocese of Canada at SerbOrth.org

Serbian Orthodox Church
Serbian Orthodox Church in Canada
Religious sees of the Serbian Orthodox Church
Eastern Orthodox dioceses in Canada
Dioceses established in the 20th century
Serbian-Canadian culture